Organización de Telecomunicaciones de Iberoamérica or Organização das Telecomunicações Ibero-americanas (OTI), formerly known as Organización de Televisión Iberoamericana (Spanish), and also known as Organização da Televisão Ibero-americana (Portuguese) (OTI) or "Organization of Iberoamerican Television" (OIT), is an organization of television networks in Latin America (Ibero-America), Spain, and Portugal. Its mission is to foster relations between television networks in the region. Among other activities, it shares news, cultural, educational and sports programming among its members.

Members 
Featured as in the OIT's member's list

Former members

Soccer broadcasting rights 
 FIFA World Cup
 Copa América
 UEFA European Championship
 UEFA Champions League 
 UEFA Europa League
 UEFA Europa Conference League
 Copa CONMEBOL Libertadores
 Copa CONMEBOL Sudamericana 
 CONCACAF Champions League 
 CONCACAF League
 Argentine Primera División
 Paraguayan Primera División
 Uruguayan Primera División

See also 
 OTI Festival
 European Broadcasting Union
 Asia-Pacific Broadcasting Union
 Caribbean Media Corporation
 Ibero-America (Latin America)
 Miss Universe

References

External links 
 

Radio organizations
Television organizations
Organizations established in 1971
1971 establishments in Mexico